The men's discus throw at the 2017 Asian Athletics Championships was held on 6 July.

Results

References

Results

Discus
Discus throw at the Asian Athletics Championships